This is a list of curlers from the Canadian province of Ontario.

Active curlers

Men

Women

Curlers from Ontario